Letní stadion, formerly known as Městský stadion, is a multi-purpose stadium in Chomutov, Czech Republic. Used primarily for football, it is the home stadium of FC Chomutov.

External links
 Photo gallery and data at Erlebnis-stadion.de

Football venues in the Czech Republic
Buildings and structures in Chomutov
Sport in Chomutov
Sports venues completed in 2012
2012 establishments in the Czech Republic
21st-century architecture in the Czech Republic